Jack Coolahan (22 August 1914 – 22 April 1988) was a former Australian rules footballer who played with Melbourne and Footscray in the Victorian Football League (VFL). He returned to his original club Mortlake in 1940, as coach.

Notes

External links 

1914 births
1988 deaths
Australian rules footballers from Victoria (Australia)
Melbourne Football Club players
Western Bulldogs players
Mortlake Football Club players
Mortlake Football Club coaches